San Joaquín is a municipality in Querétaro in central Mexico.

History
Before the Spanish, the site at "Ranas" was a mining center, principally for cinnabar which was used as a pigment. The "Ranas" site was first mined about 400C.E. In 1622 the village of "San Nicolás Tolentino en el Paraje de las Rana" was founded. In 1682 the community of Ojo de Agua de Ranas was founded.

In 1724 Viceroy Juan de Acuña, 2nd Marquis of Casa Fuerte granted the first land in the municipality. In 1728 the first Spanish mine was opened at San Juan Nepomuceno.

In 1864 the name "San Joaquín" was first used on a map.

Geography
The municipality of San Joaquín covers an area of 499 km², and is located between 99° 22' and 99° 39' West longitude, and between 21° 07' and 20° 53' North latitude. Altitude varies from a low of 600 meters to heights of 2,700 meters.

References

Municipalities of Querétaro